Eonema is a fungal genus in the family Hygrophoraceae. It is monotypic, consisting of the single corticioid species Eonema pyriforme. This fungus was previously classified in the genus Athelia until molecular analysis demonstrated that it was unrelated to the Atheliales and instead nested within the Hygrophoraceae.

See also
 List of Agaricales genera

References

Hygrophoraceae
Monotypic Agaricales genera
Taxa named by Robert Lücking
Taxa named by James D. Lawrey
Taxa described in 2009